South Carolina Highway 412 (SC 412) is a  state highway in the U.S. state of South Carolina. The highway connects rural areas of Anderson County with Starr.

Route description
SC 412 begins at an intersection with U.S. Route 29 (US 29) west-northwest of Starr, within unincorporated Anderson County community of Holland Store. It travels in a fairly east-southeasterly direction. It crosses over Lucas Creek before it intersects SC 187. The highway crosses over Big Generostee and Generostee creeks. A short distance after crossing Weems Creek, it passes Starr–Iva Middle School. In Starr, it intersects the northern terminus of SC 181 (Smith–McGee Road) just before it meets its eastern terminus, an intersection with SC 81. Here, the roadway continues as First Avenue.

Major intersections

See also

References

External links

SC 413 at Virginia Highways' South Carolina Highways Annex

412
Transportation in Anderson County, South Carolina